The Church of Jesus Christ of Latter-day Saints in Massachusetts refers to the Church of Jesus Christ of Latter-day Saints (LDS Church) and its members in Massachusetts.

Official church membership as a percentage of general population was 0.39% in 2014. According to the 2014 Pew Forum on Religion & Public Life survey, roughly 1% of Bay Staters self-identify themselves most closely with the LDS Church. The LDS Church is the 11th largest denomination in Massachusetts.

History

The nightly preachings of George J. Adams brought an audience of some 1,200 in Charlestown, Massachusetts, in 1843. At that time, there were some 14 branches (small congregations) of The Church of Jesus Christ of Latter-day Saints in the Boston area. Eleven years prior, the first missionaries for the Church arrived in Boston to organize congregations. Church President Joseph Smith passed through Boston on his way to Washington, D.C., in 1839. After President Smith was martyred in 1844, several members in Massachusetts joined the mass exodus west, and missionary work in the state slowed.

In 1894, one year after the area was reopened to missionaries, Church membership was 96. A decade later, missionaries encountered hostilities toward the Church during the highly publicized United States Senate hearings on Church leader and Senator-elect Reed Smoot, and police disallowed missionaries to hold open-air meetings. By 1930, membership was nearly 360, some of whom were recently returned missionaries studying at Harvard University. Cambridge, Massachusetts, became the headquarters for the New England States Mission. A Church building was dedicated in the area in 1956.

The Church completed and dedicated the Boston Massachusetts Temple in 2000, marking the 100th operating temple in the Church.

Stakes

As of February 2023, Massachusetts had the following stakes (with the stake center in Massachusetts):

Missions
The Eastern States Mission was organized May 6, 1839. On September 24, 1937, the New England Mission was organized as a division of the Eastern States Mission. The mission was renamed Massachusetts Boston Mission on June 20, 1974 and is the only mission based in Massachusetts. Western portions of the state is served by the New Hampshire Manchester Mission.

Temples

The Boston Massachusetts Temple was dedicated on October 1, 2000 by President Gordon B. Hinckley.

References

Further reading

External links

 Deseret News 2010 Church Almanac (Massachusetts)
 Newsroom (Massachusetts)
 ComeUntoChrist.org Latter-day Saints Visitor site
 The Church of Jesus Christ of Latter-day Saints Official site

Christianity in Massachusetts
Latter Day Saint movement in Massachusetts
Massachusetts